An alembic (from , originating from , 'cup, beaker') is an alchemical still consisting of two vessels connected by a tube, used for distillation of liquids.

Description 
The complete distilling apparatus consists of three parts: the "cucurbit" (Greek:), the still pot containing the liquid to be distilled, which is heated by a flame; the "head" or "cap" (Greek) which fits over the mouth of the cucurbit to receive the vapors, with an attached downward-sloping "tube"; and the "receiver" (or) container.  In the case of another distilling vessel, the retort, the "cap" and the "cucurbit" have been combined to form a single vessel. The anbik is also called the raʾs (head) of the cucurbit. The liquid in the cucurbit is heated or boiled; the vapour rises into the anbik, where it cools by contact with the walls and condenses, running down the spout into the receiver. A modern descendant of the alembic is the pot still, used to produce distilled beverages.

History 

Dioscorides's ambix, described in his  (c. 50 C.E.), is a helmet-shaped lid for gathering condensed mercury. For Athenaeus (c. 225 C.E.) it is a bottle or flask. For later chemists it denoted various parts of crude distillation devices.

Alembic drawings appear in works of Cleopatra the Alchemist (3rd century B.C.E.), Zosimos of Panopolis (c. 300 C.E.), and Synesius (c. 373 – c. 414 C.E.). There were alembics with two (dibikos) and three (tribikos) receivers. According to Zosimos of Panopolis, the alembic was invented by Mary the Jewess.

The anbik is described by Ibn al-Awwam in his  (Book of Agriculture), where he explains how rose-water is distilled. Some illustrations occur in the Latin translations of works which are attributed to Geber.

Unicode 
The Unicode character set specifies three symbols for alembics.  The pictograms ⚗, ⚗️, and the ancient alchemical symbol 🝪.  The latter is part of the newer UCS-4 addition that includes other ideographs like emojis and thus may not appear correctly on older browsers.

See also 
 Aludel

References

External links 
 

Alchemical tools
Arab inventions